The Santa Paula Stakes is an American Thoroughbred horse race run annually at the end of March at Santa Anita Park in Arcadia, California. An event open to three-year-old fillies, it is contested over a distance of six and one half furlongs. The race was downgraded from Grade III status for 2011 by the American Graded Stakes Committee.

The Santa Paula Stakes was run at 7 furlongs for fillies and mares, age three and older, from 1968 through 1974.

There was no race held from 1975 through 1991, nor in 1993.

Records
Speed record: (at current distance of  furlongs)
 1:14.61 - Magnificience (2007)

Most wins by a jockey:
 4 – Alex Solis (1995, 1997, 2007, 2010)

Most wins by a trainer:
 2 – Brian A. Mayberry (1992, 1994)
 2 – David Hofmans (1996, 2001)
 3 – Bob Baffert (2004, 2005, 2015)

Most wins by an owner:
 No owner has won this race more than once.

Winners

References

 The 2008 Santa Paula Stakes at the NTRA

Horse races in California
Santa Anita Park
Flat horse races for three-year-old fillies
Previously graded stakes races in the United States
Ungraded stakes races in the United States
Recurring sporting events established in 1968